Bathysciadium is a genus of sea snails, deep-sea limpets, marine gastropod mollusks in the family Bathysciadiidae.

Species
Species within the genus Bathysciadium include:

 Bathysciadium concentricum Dall, 1927
 Bathysciadium costulatum (Locard, 1898)
 Bathysciadium pacificum Dall, 1908
 Bathysciadium rotundum (Dall, 1927)
 Bathysciadium xylophagum Warén & Carrozzza in Warén, 1997

References

External links

Bathysciadiidae
Gastropod genera